David J. Francis is an American psychologist, focusing in statistical models for longitudinal data, multi-level models, latent variable models, psychometrics, reading acquisition and the early identification and prevention of reading disabilities and developmental disabilities, currently the Hugh Roy and  Hugh Roy and Lillie Cranz Cullen Distinguished University Chair at University of Houston.

References

Year of birth missing (living people)
Living people
University of Houston faculty
21st-century American psychologists
University of Houston alumni